Air Vice Marshal Teofilus Shaende is a Namibian military officer who is serving as the commander of the Namibian Air Force since 2020.

Civilian career
After completing school at Dr. Lemmer High School in Rehoboth, Shaende took employment with the Ministry of Finance as a taxation officer. He resigned to join the military in 1999 as a recruit.

Military career

Shaende joined the Namibian Defence Force in 1999 and undertook his six–months basic military training at the Osona Military School. After completion he did his private pilot's license at the Westair flying training centre and received receiving his pilots wings in the same year. In 2001 he undertook the formative junior officers course in Okahandja at the military school. In 2003 he then went to Zambia where he did the conversion and operation flying course with the Zambian Air Force. In 2004 he did the Qualified Flying Instructor (QFI) course with the Zambian Air Force.

In 2005 he was a Captain and appointed as second in command of 23 Squadron. In 2006 he was sent to China in preparation of Namibia's purchase of the F7-FT7 jet aircraft from Chengdu Aircraft Industry Group and did the FT-7 & F-7 aircraft ground school training. In 2008 he received a diploma of training in FT & F7 flying course in Namibia after qualifying on the F-7/FT-7 fighter jets, while in 2009 he did the K-8 instructor training. In February 2010 he was promoted to Lieutenant Colonel and appointed as air defence wing commanding officer during the commissioning of the F7 and FT7 fighter aircraft  at Grootfontein Air Force Base. Afterwards he was promoted to Group captain following the reorganization of air force ranks and appointed as Chief of staff: Air operations & training at the air force headquarters. In 2016 after the deployment to India as defence attache of Air Commodore Paavo Kamanya. He was promoted to Air Commodore and appointed as deputy air force commander. On 1 April 2020 he was promoted to Air Vice Marshal and appointed air force commander.

Qualifications
Certificate in Management Skills New Vision Consultancy
 2012 Diploma in Defence and Security Studies, University of Zambia
 2012 Diploma Defence & Security Management Course, Defence Academy of the United Kingdom
 Certificate in Aviation Security Management and Organization, International Air Transport Association
 Certificate in Security Risk & Crisis Management and Bomb Threat Assessment, International Air Transport Association
 Certificate in Aviation Safety  West Side Aviation South Africa
 2013 Diploma Defence and Security Management Course, Command and Staff  College Zambia 
 2014 Strike Operational Conversion, Karibib Air Force Base
 2016 Diploma in Security and Strategic Studies, National Defence College United Republic of Tanzania 
 2016 Diploma in Security and Strategic Studies,  University of Dar Es Salaam 
 2018 Basic Military Law Course, Military School

Honours and decorations
Commendation Certificate for hard work  
  Air Cadre medal 
  Air Force Longevity medal
  Air Force Commander's exemplary medal

References

Living people
Namibian Air Force air marshals
1977 births